The Dogs of War is a 1980 American war film based upon the 1974 novel of the same name by Frederick Forsyth. Largely filmed in Belize, it was directed by John Irvin and starred Christopher Walken and Tom Berenger. In it a small mercenary unit of soldiers is privately hired to depose the president of a fictional African country modeled after Guinea-Bissau, Guinea-Conakry, Equatorial Guinea and Angola (as they were in the late 1970s), so that a British tycoon can gain access to a platinum deposit.

The title is based on a phrase from William Shakespeare's play Julius Caesar: "Cry, 'Havoc!', and let slip the dogs of war."

Plot
Having escaped from Central America with his comrades Drew, Derek, Michel, Terry and Richard, mercenary Jamie Shannon gets an offer from Endean, a British businessman working for a major tycoon. Endean's company is interested in "certain resources" in the small African nation of Zangaro, which is run by the brutal dictator, President Kimba.

Shannon goes on a reconnaissance mission to Zangaro's capital of Clarence and meets a British documentary filmmaker named North, who fills him in on the political situation in Zangaro. However, Shannon's activities arouse the suspicions of the police (especially a suspected dalliance with a woman who turns out to be one of Kimba's mistresses) and he is arrested, severely beaten and imprisoned. His wounds are treated by Dr. Okoye, a physician and prisoner who was formerly a moderate political leader. North agitates for Shannon's release, and two days later he is deported.

When Shannon tells Endean that there is no chance of an internal coup, Endean offers him $100,000 to overthrow Kimba by invading Zangaro with a mercenary army. Endean's employer intends to install a puppet government led by Colonel Bobi, Kimba's greedy former ally, allowing Endean's employer to exploit the country's newly discovered platinum resources, an agreement guaranteed by Colonel Bobi. Shannon refuses the offer and instead proposes to his estranged girlfriend Jessie that they start a new life in the western U.S. When she refuses his proposal, he accepts Endean's contract on condition that he will have complete control of the military operation.

Provided with a million dollars for expenses, Shannon contacts some of his associates from Central America and they meet in London to plan the coup. The group illegally procures a supply of Uzi submachine guns, ammunition, rocket launchers, mines and other weapons from arms dealers. North encounters Shannon by chance in London and suspects him of being a CIA agent. Shannon asks Drew to scare North away without hurting him, but North is killed by a hitman hired by Endean to follow Shannon and his crew. Drew captures the assassin, and when a furious Shannon learns that Endean had sent the hitman but that the hitman had killed North on his own initiative he kills the assassin in turn and leaves the body at Endean's house during a dinner party held for Colonel Bobi.

To transport the group and equipment to the coast of Zangaro, Shannon hires a small freighter and crew. At sea, the team is joined by a force of Zangaran exiles trained as soldiers by a former mercenary colleague. Once ashore in a night attack, the mercenaries and their troops use their array of weapons to attack the military garrison where Kimba lives. Drew bursts into a shack in the barracks' courtyard and finds only a young woman with a baby; when he turns to leave without harming them, she shoots him in the back with a pistol. After the mercenaries storm the burning, bullet-scarred ruins of the garrison, Shannon blasts his way into Kimba's mansion. There he finds the dictator stuffing packs of bills into a briefcase; when a whimpering Kimba offers Shannon some of the money to spare his life, Shannon kills him.

The following morning, Endean arrives by helicopter with Colonel Bobi and they enter the presidential residence, where they find Shannon and Dr. Okoye awaiting their overdue arrival. Shannon introduces Dr. Okoye as Zangaro's new president, and when Endean protests ("This whole country's bought and paid for!"), Shannon tells him, "You're going to have to buy it all over again," and silences him by shooting Bobi.

Shannon, Derek and Michel load Drew's body onto a Land Rover, in line with the toast they drank on planning the operation: "Everyone comes home." The film concludes with the mercenaries driving through the deserted streets of Clarence until they are out of frame.

Cast

 Christopher Walken as Jamie Shannon
 Tom Berenger as Drew Blakeley
 Colin Blakely as Alan North
 Hugh Millais as Endean
 Paul Freeman as Derek Godwin
 Jean-François Stévenin as Michel-Claude
 JoBeth Williams as Jessie
 Maggie Scott as Gabrielle
 Robert Urquhart as Capt. Lockhart
 Winston Ntshona as Dr Okoye
 Pedro Armendáriz Jr. as The Captain
 Harlan Cary Poe as Richard
 Ed O'Neill as Terry
 Shane Rimmer as Dr. Oaks
 George Harris as Colonel Bobi
 David Schofield as Endean's Man
 Terence Rigby as Hackett
 Olu Jacobs as Immigration officer
 Alan Beckwith as Mercenary
 Jim Broadbent as Film Crew

Production
United Artists bought rights to the novel in 1974. Don Siegel was going to direct but did not like the screenplay. Abbey Mann wrote a new screenplay. Then Michael Cimino wrote another draft. Norman Jewison became attached as producer-director and Gary Devore rewrote the script. Jewison decided to produce, not direct, and looked for another director. Initially Jewison hired Michael Cimino to direct with Clint Eastwood and Nick Nolte starring, but he dropped out of the film in order to work on Heaven's Gate. John Irvin became director.

Principal photography began on February 18, 1980. The opening Central American scene was filmed at the Miami Glider Port southwest of Miami, Florida. Later African country scenes were filmed in Belize City, Belize, and the surrounding area, since Irwin decided shooting the scenes in Africa in real-life would be too risky. The manually-turned swinging bridge shown during the attack is one of the largest of its kind in the world. The film features several weapons that were prominent in popular culture during the 1980s. The Uzi submachine guns used in the film (changed from the German Second World War vintage Schmeissers of the novel) were a mix of real Uzis and set-dressed Ingram MAC-10s. Shannon's grenade launcher, depicted in the promotional poster, dubbed the "XM-18" in the film, is a Manville gun – a design later used by the MM-1 grenade launcher. Shooting also took place in New York City and London.

This was only the second international feature for director John Irvin, who previously worked as a documentary maker during the Vietnam War. He went on to direct stars such as Arnold Schwarzenegger (Raw Deal), Don Cheadle (Hamburger Hill) and Michael Caine (Shiner).

Cinematographer Jack Cardiff had previously directed an account of mercenaries in Africa entitled Dark of the Sun.  Composer Geoffrey Burgon concludes the film with A. E. Housman's Epitaph for an Army of Mercenaries sung over the end titles.

Release

Home media
The Dogs of War was released to DVD by MGM Home Video on 20 November 2001 as a Region 1 widescreen DVD and later on by Twilight Time (under license from MGM) as a multiregion widescreen Blu-ray DVD. It is also available to buy on VUDU's (Fandango) streaming platform.
As of November 2022 the film is available for free viewing on Freevee.

Reception

Critical response
On Rotten Tomatoes, the film holds a rating of 67% from 18 reviews.

References

External links
 
 

1980 films
1980 action films
American war films
British war films
Films based on British novels
Films based on works by Frederick Forsyth
War adventure films
Films directed by John Irvin
United Artists films
Films shot in Belize
Films shot in Florida
Films shot in New York City
1980 directorial debut films
Films with screenplays by Gary DeVore
Films about coups d'état
Films set in Africa
Films shot in Miami
Films shot in London
Films about mercenaries
1980s English-language films
1980s American films
1980s British films